Stroughbury Island is an island in Lake Michigan. It is located 0.25 miles due east of 26th Rd, Rapid River in the state of Michigan. The island can easily be seen from Rapid River Boat Launch, just a short swim from the Nirvana Resort and Cabins.

Stroughbury Island is part of Little Bay de noc in northwestern Lake Michigan. The highest point on Stroughbury Island is 30 feet above sea level, and 20 feet above the level of the lake. One of the most prominent shoreline features of Stroughbury Island is Gaze Point, a northern headland that stretches toward the Rapid River mainland. More than one-quarter of the island, Stroughbury Minor, is owned by the state of Michigan and is administered as part of Lake Superior State Forest, largely due to its preservation of an Ojibwe, or Menominee Indian petroglyph. Stroughbury Minor separates from Stroughbury Major most every spring, allowing for two distinct campsites on either end.

References

Islands of Lake Michigan in Michigan
Islands of Delta County, Michigan